Patrick Joseph McLaughlin (born 14 January 1991) is a Northern Irish professional footballer who plays as a midfielder for  club York City. He has played in the Football League for the club. McLaughlin previously played for Newcastle United, Grimsby Town, Harrogate Town, Gateshead, Hartlepool United and Kidderminster Harriers. He has represented Northern Ireland at levels up to under-21.

Club career

Early career

Born in Larne, County Antrim, McLaughlin began his career at Newcastle United in July 2007. He signed a professional contract a year later but he never played a match at St James' Park. In June 2011, McLaughlin was released by Newcastle after four years at the club.

McLaughlin signed for Conference Premier club York City on 30 June 2011 on a two-year contract. McLaughlin said "I thought York was the best club for me. The gaffer has given me the chance to come down here and play some football." He made his debut for York on the opening day of the 2011–12 season in a 2–1 away win against Ebbsfleet United. McLaughlin started in the York team that beat Newport County 2–0 at Wembley Stadium in the 2012 FA Trophy Final. Eight days later, he came on as an 86th-minute substitute in the 2–1 win over Luton Town in the 2012 Conference Premier play-off Final at Wembley Stadium, seeing the club win promotion to League Two after an eight-year absence from the Football League. He finished the season with 55 appearances and scored 13 goals. After making 33 appearances and scoring four goals for York in 2012–13, he was released by the club.

Grimsby Town and Gateshead
McLaughlin signed for Conference Premier club Grimsby Town on 28 June 2013 on a two-year contract. Following 2013–14, in which he was a regular in the team that was defeated in the semi-final of both the Conference Premier play-offs and the FA Trophy, McLaughlin found himself less involved with the first team during 2014–15. This prompted him to join Conference North club Harrogate Town on loan in March 2015. He was released by Grimsby at the end of the season.

McLaughlin signed for National League club Gateshead on 10 July 2015 on a one-year contract. After scoring 4 goals in 41 appearances during 2015–16, McLaughlin signed a new two-year contract with Gateshead in May 2016.

Hartlepool United and York City return
McLaughlin signed for Gateshead's National League rivals Hartlepool United on 26 June 2018 on a contract of undisclosed length. He rejoined York City on 23 January 2019 on loan until the end of the 2018–19 season, with the club now in the National League North. He signed for the club permanently on 30 April 2019 on a two year-contract.

On 14 November 2022, McLaughlin signed for Kidderminster Harriers on a month's loan.

International career
McLaughlin has represented Northern Ireland at various youth levels, up to under-21 level. He earned 10 caps for the under-21 team from 2010 to 2012.

Career statistics

Honours
York City
FA Trophy: 2011–12
Conference Premier play-offs: 2012

References

External links

Profile at the York City F.C. website
Profile at the Irish Football Association website

1991 births
Living people
People from Larne
Sportspeople from County Antrim
Association footballers from Northern Ireland
Association football midfielders
Newcastle United F.C. players
York City F.C. players
Grimsby Town F.C. players
Harrogate Town A.F.C. players
Gateshead F.C. players
Hartlepool United F.C. players
Kidderminster Harriers F.C. players
National League (English football) players
English Football League players
Northern Ireland youth international footballers
Northern Ireland under-21 international footballers